Scotland’s Environment and Rural Services (SEARS) is a partnership between eight public bodies aiming to improve experience among Scotland's land managers by working together to provide an efficient and effective service.

The SEARS partners are:

 Animal Health and Veterinary Laboratories Agency
 Cairngorms National Park Authority
 Crofters Commission
 Forestry Commission Scotland
 Loch Lomond and the Trossachs National Park Authority
 Scottish Environment Protection Agency (SEPA)
 Scottish Government Rural Payments and Inspections Directorate
 Scottish Natural Heritage

History
SEARS launched as a partnership of nine organisations in 2008. The Deer Commission for Scotland, which was formerly a member, was abolished and its functions transferred to Scottish Natural Heritage on 1 August 2010.

SEARS marked its first anniversary by publication of its first annual review at the Royal Highland Show 2009 by Environment Minister Roseanna Cunningham MSP.

Among the key service improvements since SEARS got underway in June 2008 are annual savings of almost £150,000 to the sheep farming industry in annual groundwater licence charge waivers and around 2,200 less inspections for land managers.

References

 http://www.farmersguardian.com/story.asp?storycode=27208

External links
 Scotland's Environmental and Rural Services
 Animal Health website
 Cairngorms
 Crofters Commission
 DCS website
 FCS website
 Loch Lomond website
 Scottish Environment Protection Agency (SEPA)
 SGRPID website 
 SNH website

 
2008 establishments in Scotland
Government agencies established in 2008
Organisations supported by the Scottish Government